Selfmedikasie is a full-length album by South African punk rock band Fokofpolisiekar. It was released in 2017 after a crowdfunding campaign on Thundafund.

Track listing

References

External links 
Official Fokofpolisiekar website
Crowdfunding page for the album

2017 albums
Fokofpolisiekar albums